Jacqui is a given name, usually a diminutive form of Jacqueline or Jacquelyn. Notable people with the name include:

Jacqui Abbott (born 1973), female lead singer with the band The Beautiful South
Jacqui Ainsley (born 1981), English model from Southend in Essex
Jacqui Cooper (born 1973), Australian freestyle skier
Jacqui Cowderoy, former Australian alpine skier
Jacqui Dankworth, British singer
Jacqui Dean (born 1957), New Zealand politician
Jacqui Delaney, Australian netball player and coach
Jacqui Dunn (born 1984), Australian artistic gymnast
Jacqui Frisby, camogie player and accounts assistant
Jacqui Gordon (born 1962), Australian actress
Jacqui Gordon-Lawrence, British former actress
Jacqui Hurley (born 1984), Irish athlete, sports manager, sports broadcaster and chat show host
Jacqui Jackson, the single parent of seven children, three adolescent girls and four boys
Jacqui Katona, western-educated Aboriginal woman, led the campaign to stop the Jabiluka uranium mine in the Northern Territory
Jacqui Lait (born 1947), British politician and Conservative Party Member of Parliament for Beckenham
Jacqui Lambie, Australian Politician
Jacqui Malouf (born 1968), television host, cook, and author
Jacqui Maxwell (born 1981), Australian actress
Jacqui McQueen, fictional character from the Channel 4 soap opera Hollyoaks
Jacqui McShee (born 1943), English singer
Jacqui Mengler, Australian sprint canoeist who competed in the late 1990s
Jacqui Oatley, British sports broadcaster for BBC Sport
Jacqui Safra, descendant of the Syrian-Swiss Jewish Safra banking family
Jacqui Smith (born 1962), British Labour politician, the first ever female Home Secretary
Jacqui Wood (born 1950), British archaeologist and writer
song written by Richie Powell

English feminine given names
French feminine given names
Irish feminine given names
Swiss feminine given names